Vinicio Bernardini (16 July 1926 – 23 November 2020) was an Italian politician.

Biography
He served as a Deputy from 1976–1983 and Mayor of Pisa for two terms.

Bernardini died on 23 November 2020, of complications from COVID-19. He was 94.

References

1926 births
2020 deaths
Mayors of Pisa
Deaths from the COVID-19 pandemic in Tuscany
Deputies of Legislature VII of Italy
Deputies of Legislature VIII of Italy